Jacobo Harootian was an Armenian-Mexican general who participated in the Mexican Revolution.

Early life

He was probably born in Aleppo, Syria to an Armenian family and spent most of his life in Zumpango del Río, Guerrero. Despite his wealth, he was a known benefactor who built roads that connected his own town with other local villages.

Military career

In 1913, he enrolled as a physician and then as a soldier for Victoriano Huerta's army. As a close friend of Juan Andrew Almazán, Harootian was chosen to command a legion of 2,000 soldiers who fought in the Battle of Zacatecas against Pancho Villa's forces on June 23, 1914.

Late life and exile

Shortly after the fall of Victoriano Huerta's de facto government, Harootian was persecuted by the new authorities and chose to leave the country.

Legacy

Once the Mexican Revolution came to an end, the socialist government deprived him and his family of their properties. His former house is now the Town Hall of his homeplace, Zumpango del Río.

Bibliography

References

Military personnel from Guerrero
People from Aleppo
People of the Mexican Revolution
Mexican generals
Mexican people of Armenian descent
Armenian generals
Emigrants from the Ottoman Empire to Mexico
Syrian people of Armenian descent
Syrian emigrants to Mexico
Year of birth missing
Year of death missing